The Ohrid Framework Agreement (Albanian: Marrëveshja e Ohrit) was the peace deal signed by the government of the Republic of Macedonia (now North Macedonia) and representatives of the Albanian minority on 13 August 2001. The agreement was signed by the country's four political parties after international mediators demanded their commitment to its ratification and implementation within a four-year period.

Provisions 
The Ohrid Agreement created a framework for North Macedonia as a civic state, ending the armed conflict between the National Liberation Army and the security forces of Macedonia. It established basic principles of the state such as cessation of hostilities, voluntary disarmament of ethnic Albanian armed groups, government devolution, and the reform of minority political and cultural rights. 

The Agreement also included provisions for altering the official languages of the country, with any language spoken by more than 20% of the population becoming co-official with the Macedonian language at the municipal level. Only the Albanian language, with an approximate 25% of the population being speakers, currently qualifies as a co-official language under this criterion. The Agreement is an example of the adoption of consociationalism.

According to the document, the English-language version is the only authentic version of the Ohrid Framework Agreement. The Government of Macedonia had to adapt the Constitution of Macedonia in order to provide the Albanian minority living in Macedonia with fifteen basic rights. The lead negotiator, on the behalf of the European Union, was François Léotard. James W. Pardew represented the United States.

Notes

External links
Ohrid Framework Agreement Authoritative English Text hosted via Organization for Security and Co-operation in Europe.
Ohrid Framework Agreement Text in Macedonian
Ohrid Framework Agreement Text in Albanian
Florian Bieber et al., Power Sharing and the Implementation of the Ohrid Framework Agreement, Friedrich Ebert Stiftung - Office Macedonia, Skopje, 2008.
Marija Risteska and Zhidas Daskalovski (eds), One decade after the Ohrid Framework Agreement: Lessons (to be) learned from the Macedonian experience, Friedrich Ebert Stiftung, Center for research and policy making, 2011.
Blerim Reka (ed.), Ten years from the Ohrid Framework Agreement, South East European University, Tetovo, 2011.

2001 insurgency in Macedonia
Linguistic rights
Minority rights
Power sharing
Treaties of North Macedonia
Treaties concluded in 2001
Treaties entered into force in 2001
Peace treaties
Ohrid
August 2001 events in Europe